Cotton Exchange may refer to:

Bremen Cotton Exchange (Bremer Baumwollbörse)
Karachi Cotton Exchange
Liverpool Cotton Exchange Building
Royal Exchange, Manchester, the United Kingdom's principal cotton exchange from 1729 until 1968
New Orleans Cotton Exchange
New York Cotton Exchange
Mobile Cotton Exchange
Memphis Cotton Exchange
Savannah Cotton Exchange
The Seam, online cotton exchange

See also
Cotton Exchange Building (disambiguation)